Europan is a biennial competition for young architects under 40 years of age to design innovative housing schemes for sites across Europe. The competition encourages architects to address social and economic changes occurring in towns and cities and offers the opportunity for cross-cultural learning and networking for the architects and site promoters involved.

Europan 9 ran from February 2007 - January 2008. The competition was participated in by 22 countries, submitting 73 sites across Europe and receiving 1,752 entries in total.

9 European countries proposing 40 sites are participating to the Europan 16 edition on a common theme: Living Cities - Metabolic Vitalities / Inclusive Vitalities.

External links
Official website
Europan Polska website
Europan Hungary website
Europan Spain website
Europan Finland website

Architectural competitions